The 1924 Norwegian Football Cup was the 23rd season of the Norwegian annual knockout football tournament. The tournament was open for all members of NFF. Odd won their ninth title, having beaten Mjøndalen in the final. Brann were the defending champions, but were eliminated by Mjøndalen in the semifinal.

First round

|-
|colspan="3" style="background-color:#97DEFF"|Replay

|-
|colspan="3" style="background-color:#97DEFF"|2nd replay

|-
|colspan="3" style="background-color:#97DEFF"|3rd replay

|}

Second round

|}

Third round

|-
|colspan="3" style="background-color:#97DEFF"|Replay

|}

Quarter-finals

|}

Semi-finals

|}

Final

See also
1924 in Norwegian football

References

Norwegian Football Cup seasons
Norway
Football Cup